Dean John Neal (born 5 January 1961) is an English former professional footballer who played as a striker. Active in both England and the United States, Neal scored 68 goals in 213 league appearances over a nine-year professional career.

Career
Born in Edmonton, London, Neal began his career at Queens Park Rangers, scoring 8 goals in 22 appearances in the Football League between 1979 and 1981. Neal then spent the 1981 season in the North American Soccer League with the Tulsa Roughnecks, before returning to England to play with Millwall, scoring 42 goals in 120 appearances over the next four years. Neal then moved to Southend United in 1985, scoring 6 goals in 40 appearances over the next three years.

Neal later played non-league football with Fisher Athletic.

References

1961 births
Living people
English footballers
Queens Park Rangers F.C. players
Tulsa Roughnecks (1978–1984) players
Millwall F.C. players
Southend United F.C. players
Fisher Athletic F.C. players
English Football League players
North American Soccer League (1968–1984) players
Association football forwards
English expatriate sportspeople in the United States
Expatriate soccer players in the United States
English expatriate footballers